The Rub were an English rock band, formed in 1998 in Whalley Range, Manchester by former Stone Roses drummer Alan "Reni" Wren.

The band's line up featured Reni on vocals and lead guitar along with rhythm guitarist and backing vocalist Casey Longden, bassist and backing vocalist Neil Nisbet and drummer Mik Grant. Longden and Nisbet were from Manchester, and Grant from Greenock.

Initially called Hunkpapa, earlier incarnations featured former bandmate Pete Garner on bass and Happy Mondays percussionist Lee Mullen.

The band played several gigs in England during the spring of 2001, including Manchester University where they were introduced on stage by ex-Stone Roses bassist Mani. They split up prior to releasing any studio material.

References

English rock music groups